The Favourite Worst Nightmare Tour was the second worldwide concert tour by British indie rock band Arctic Monkeys in support of their second studio album, Favourite Worst Nightmare.

The tour began from secret gig on 10 February 2007 in The Leadmill, Sheffield, England and ended on 17 December 2007 in Carling Apollo Manchester, Manchester, England. The last show of the tour was recorded for DVD At the Apollo.

During this tour, Arctic Monkeys played Glastonbury Festival in June 2007, first ever Friday at T in the Park in July 2007, two nights at Summer Sonic Tokyo Festival in Japan in August 2007, Austin City Limits Music Festival in US and Virgin Festival in Canada in September 2007 and many more shows all around the world.

Recording

The group released the concert film At the Apollo on DVD in 3 November 2008. The film was directed by Richard Ayoade, and filmed on super 16mm film with cinematography by Danny Cohen. It features footage of the band performing on 17 December 2007, at their last show of the tour in Manchester's Carling Apollo. The film received the NME Award for Best Music DVD in 2009.

Songs performed

Whatever People Say I Am, That's What I'm Not
 "The View from the Afternoon"
 "I Bet You Look Good on the Dancefloor"
 "Fake Tales of San Francisco"
 "Dancing Shoes"
 "You Probably Couldn't See for the Lights but You Were Staring Straight at Me"
 "Still Take You Home"
 "Mardy Bum"
 "When the Sun Goes Down"
 "From the Ritz to the Rubble"
 "A Certain Romance"

Favourite Worst Nightmare
 "Brianstorm"
 "Teddy Picker"
 "D Is for Dangerous"	 	
 "Balaclava"
 "Fluorescent Adolescent"
 "Do Me a Favour"
 "This House Is a Circus"
 "If You Were There, Beware"
 "Old Yellow Bricks"
 "505"

Non-album single
"Leave Before the Lights Come On"

B-sides
 "Bad Woman" (with Richard Hawley)(Pat Farrell and the Believers cover)
 "Da Frame 2R"
 "Nettles"
 "Plastic Tramp"
"Temptation Greets You Like Your Naughty Friend" (feat. Dizzee Rascal)
"What If You Were Right the First Time?" 
"If You Found This It's Probably Too Late"

Covers
 "Diamonds Are Forever" by Shirley Bassey

Unreleased
 "Sandtrap"
 "Put Me in a Terror Pocket"

Set list
Average set list for the tour:

This House Is a Circus
Still Take You Home
Dancing Shoes
Brianstorm
From the Ritz to the Rubble
Teddy Picker
Balaclava
Fake Tales of San Francisco
I Bet You Look Good on the Dancefloor
D Is for Dangerous
Old Yellow Bricks
The View From the Afternoon
Fluorescent Adolescent
Do Me a Favour
When the Sun Goes Down
If You Were There, Beware
Leave Before the Lights Come On
A Certain Romance

Tour dates

Personnel

Arctic Monkeys
Alex Turner – lead vocals, guitar, keyboards
Jamie Cook – guitar, backing vocals
Nick O'Malley – bass guitar, backing vocals
Matt Helders – drums, backing vocals

Guests
Miles Kane – guitar on "Plastic Tramp" and "505"
Dizzee Rascal – rap vocals on "Temptation Greets You Like Your Naughty Friend"
James Ford – keyboards on "Diamonds Are Forever"
Tom Rowley – guitar on "505" (at T in The Park concert)
Richard Hawley – lead vocals, tambourine on "Bad Woman"

Notes

References

2007 concert tours